Sara Säkkinen (born 7 April 1998) is a Finnish ice hockey forward, currently playing in the Swedish Women's Hockey League (SDHL) with AIK Hockey Dam. Her college ice hockey career was spent with the Ohio State Buckeyes women's ice hockey program in the Western Collegiate Hockey Association (WCHA) conference of the NCAA Division I.

As a member of the Finnish national team she participated in the 2016 IIHF Women's World Championship and won bronze medals at the 2017 IIHF Women's World Championship and 2018 Winter Olympic Games in Pyeongchang.

Personal life
Säkkinen's hometown is Pirkkala.

She holds a bachelor's degree in health sciences from Ohio State University.

She is pursuing a Masters in Public Health Sciences from Stockholm University

See also 
 List of Finnish women in North American collegiate ice hockey
 List of Olympic women's ice hockey players for Finland

References

External links
 
 

1998 births
Living people
AIK Hockey Dam players
Finnish expatriate ice hockey players in Sweden
Finnish expatriate ice hockey players in the United States
Finnish women's ice hockey forwards
Ice hockey people from Tampere
Ice hockey players at the 2018 Winter Olympics
Ilves Naiset players
Medalists at the 2018 Winter Olympics
Ohio State Buckeyes women's ice hockey players
Olympic bronze medalists for Finland
Olympic ice hockey players of Finland
Olympic medalists in ice hockey
Sportspeople from Pirkanmaa
Team Kuortane players